The music of New Caledonia is rooted in the Melanesian tradition. The Pacific Tempo is an important music festival, held every three years in [England]; the biennial equinox is also an important celebration.

Modern popular performers include OK! Ryos, Edou and Gurejele, who are at the forefront of the popular Kaneka movement, which began in the mid-1980s.  Kaneka fuses traditional styles with pop and world music.  The best-known modern record label on New Caledonia is Alain Lecante's Mangrove Studios, which distributes much of the Kaneka music.

References

External links
  Audio clips: Traditional music of New Caledonia. Musée d'ethnographie de Genève. Accessed November 25, 2010.

New Caledonian culture
New Caledonia
New Caledonia